The 1915 Milan–San Remo was the ninth edition of the Milan–San Remo cycle race and was held on 28 March 1915. The race started in Milan and finished in San Remo. The race was won by Ezio Corlaita.

General classification

References

1915
1915 in road cycling
1915 in Italian sport
March 1915 sports events